The Swan River is a river in the south west of Western Australia. The river runs through the metropolitan area of Perth, Western Australia's capital and largest city.

Course of river
The Swan River estuary flows through the city of Perth. Its lower reaches are relatively wide and deep, with few constrictions, while the upper reaches are usually quite narrow and shallow.

It has three major tributaries, the Avon River, Canning River and Helena River. The latter two have dams (Canning Dam and Mundaring Weir) which provide a sizeable part of the potable water requirements for Perth and the regions surrounding. The Avon River contributes the majority of the freshwater flow. The climate of the catchment is Mediterranean, with mild wet winters, hot dry summers, and the associated highly seasonal rainfall and flow regime.

The river then narrows into Blackwall Reach, a narrow and deep stretch leading the river through Fremantle Harbour to the sea.

The Noongar people believe that the Darling Scarp represents the body of a Wagyl (also spelt Waugal) – a snakelike being from Dreamtime that meandered over the land creating rivers, waterways and lakes. It is thought that the Wagyl/Waugal created the Swan River.

Geology
Before the Tertiary, when the sea level was much lower than at present, the Swan River curved around to the north of Rottnest Island, and disgorged itself into the Indian Ocean slightly to the north and west of Rottnest. In doing so, it carved a gorge about the size of the Grand Canyon. Now known as Perth Canyon, this feature still exists as a submarine canyon near the edge of the continental shelf.

Geography

The river is located in a Mediterranean climate, with hot dry summers and cool wet winters, although this balance appears to be changing due to climate change. The Swan is located on the edge of the Darling Scarp, flowing downhill across the coastal plain to its mouth at Fremantle.

Sources
The Avon flows north, passing through the towns of Brookton, Beverley, York, Northam and Toodyay. It is joined by tributaries including the Dale River, the Mortlock River and the Brockman River. The Avon becomes the Swan as Wooroloo Brook enters the river near Walyunga National Park.

Tributaries
More tributaries including Ellen Brook, Jane Brook, Henley Brook, Wandoo Creek, Bennett Brook, Blackadder Creek, Limestone Creek, Susannah Brook, and the Helena River enter the river between Wooroloo Brook and Guildford; however, most of these have either dried up or become seasonally flowing due to human impacts such as land clearing and development.

Swan coastal plain

Between Perth and Guildford the river goes through several loops. Originally, areas including the Maylands Peninsula, Ascot and Burswood, through Claise Brook and north of the city to Herdsman Lake were swampy wetlands. Most of the wetlands have since been reclaimed for land development. Heirisson Island, upon which The Causeway passes over, was once a collection of small islets known as the Heirisson Islands.

Perth Water and Melville Water
Perth Water, between the city and South Perth, is separated from the main estuary by the Narrows, over which the Narrows Bridge was built in 1959. The river then opens up into the large expanse of the river known as Melville Water. Point Walter has a protruding spit that extends up to  into the river, forcing river traffic to detour around it.

Narrowing and Fremantle

The river narrows between Chidley Point and Blackwall Reach, curving around Point Roe and Preston Point before narrowing into the harbour. Stirling Bridge and the Fremantle Traffic Bridge cross the river north of the rivermouth. The Swan River empties into the Indian Ocean at Fremantle Harbour.

Notable features

Fremantle Harbour
Point Brown
Rous Head
Arthur Head
Victoria Quay
Point Direction
Preston Point
Rocky Bay
Point Roe
Chidley Point
Blackwall Reach
Butler's Hump
Point Walter
Mosman Bay
Keanes Point
Freshwater Bay
Point Resolution
Melville Water
Lucky Bay
Point Waylen
Alfred Cove
Point Dundas
Waylen Bay
Point Heathcote
Quarry Point
Mounts Bay
Point Lewis
Mill Point
Point Belches
Elizabeth Quay
Pelican Point
Matilda Bay
The Narrows
Perth Water
Point Fraser
Heirisson Island
Claise Brook
Maylands Peninsula
Ron Courtney Island
Swan Valley
Kuljak Island

Flora and fauna
Plant and animal life found in or near the Swan-Canning Estuary include:
 Over 130 species of fish including bull sharks (Carcharhinus leucas), rays, cobblers (Cnidoglanis macrocephalus, also known as Swan River catfish), herring (Elops machnata), pilchard (Sardinops neopilchardus), bream (Kyphosus sydneyanus), flatheads, leatherjackets and blowfish (Tetraodontidae)
 Jellyfish including Phyllorhiza punctata and Aurelia aurita
 Bottlenose dolphins
 Crustaceans including prawns and blue manna crabs
 Amphipod Melita zeylanica kauerti described based on specimen that was collected from under Middle Swan Bridge
 Molluscs including Mytilidae, Galeommatidae
 Birds including the eponymous black swan, silver gull, cormorants (locally referred to as "shags"), twenty-eight parrots, rainbow lorikeet, kingfisher, red-tailed black cockatoo, Australian pelican, Australian magpie, heron and ducks

History

The river was named Swarte Swaene-Revier by Dutch explorer, Willem de Vlamingh in 1697, after the famous black swans of the area. Vlamingh sailed with a small party up the river to around Heirisson Island.

A French expedition under Nicholas Baudin also sailed up the river in 1801.

Governor Stirling's intention was that the name "Swan River" refer only to the watercourse upstream of the Heirisson Islands. All of the rest, including Perth Water, he considered estuarine and which he referred to as "Melville Water".  The Government notice dated 27 July 1829 stated "... the first stone will be laid of a new town to be called 'Perth', near the entrance to the estuary of the Swan River."

Almost immediately after the Town of Perth was established, a systematic effort was underway to reshape the river.  This was done for many reasons:
 to alleviate flooding in winter periods;
 improve access for boats by having deeper channels and jetties;
 removal of marshy land which created a mosquito menace;
 enlargement of dry land for agriculture and building.

Perth streets were often sandy bogs which caused Governor James Stirling in 1837 to report to the Secretary of State for Colonies:

At the present time it can scarcely be said that any roads exist, although certain lines of communication have been improved by clearing them of timber and by bridging streams and by establishing ferries in the broader parts of the Swan River ...

Parts of the river required dredging with the material dumped onto the mud flats to raise the adjoining land.  An exceptionally wet winter in 1862 saw major flooding throughout the area – the effect of which was exacerbated by the extent of the reclaimed lands. The first bucket dredge in Western Australia was the Black Swan, used between 1872 and 1911 for dredging channels in the river, as well as reclamation.

Notable features
A number of features of the river, particularly around the city, have reshaped its profile since European settlement in 1829:

Claise Brook – named Clause's Brook on early maps, after Frederick Clause.  This was a fresh water creek which emptied the network of natural lakes north of the city.  Before an effective sewerage system was built, it became an open sewer which dumped waste directly into the river for many years during the 1800s and early 1900s.  The area surrounding has been mainly industrial for most of the period of European settlement and it has a long history of neglect.  Since the late 1980s, the East Perth redevelopment has dramatically tidied up the area and works include a landscaped inlet off the river large enough for boats.  The area is now largely residential and the brook exists in name only with the lakes having been either removed or managed by man-made drainage systems.
Point Fraser – early maps showed this as a major promontory on the northern side of the river west of the Causeway.  It disappeared between 1921 and 1935 when land fill was added on both sides, straightening the irregular foreshore and forming the rectangular 'The Esplanade'.
The Esplanade – the northern riverbank originally ran close to the base of the escarpment generally a single block width south of St Georges Terrace.  Houses built on the southern side of St Georges Terrace included market gardens which ran to the waters edge.
Heirisson Islands – a series of mudflats that were slightly more upstream from today's single man-made island which has deep channels on each side.
Burswood – early in the settlement the Perth flats restricted the passage of all but flat bottom boats travelling between Perth and Guildford. It was decided that a canal be built to bypass these creating Burswood Island. In 1831 it took seven men 107 days to do the work. Further improvements were made in 1834. The area on the south side of the river upstream from the causeway was filled throughout the 1900s, reclaiming an area five-times the area of the Mitchell Interchange/Narrows Bridge works.
Point Belches – later known as Mill Point, South Perth.  Originally existed as a sandy promontory surrounding a deep semi-circular bay.  This was later named Millers Pool and was eventually filled in and widened to become the present-day South Perth peninsula to which the Narrows Bridge and Kwinana Freeway adjoin.
Point Lewis (also known as 'One-Tree Point' after a solitary tree that stood on the site for many years) – the northern side of the Narrows Bridge site, and now beneath the interchange.
Mounts Bay – a modest reclamation was done between 1921 and 1935.  In the 1950s works involving the Narrows Bridge started and in 1957 the bay was dramatically reduced in size with works related to the Mitchell Interchange and the northern approaches to the Narrows.  An elderly Bessie Rischbieth famously protested against the project by standing in the shallows in front of the bulldozers for a whole day in 1957.  She succeeded in halting progress – for that one day.
Bazaar Terrace/Bazaar Street – in the early days of the settlement this waterfront road between William Street and Mill Street was an important commercial focus with port facilities including several jetties adjoining.  It is now approximately where Mounts Bay Road is today and set well back from the foreshore.  It had a prominent limestone wall and promenade built using material quarried from Mount Eliza.
River mouth at Fremantle – the harbour was built in the 1890s and the limestone reef blocking the river was removed at the same time, after 70 years of demands. The dredging of the area to build the Harbour effectively changed the river dynamics from a winter flushing flow to a tidal flushing estuary. It was also at this time that the Helena River was dammed as part of C. Y. O'Connor's ambitious and successful plan to provide water to the Kalgoorlie Goldfields.

Environmental issues
The river has been used for the disposal all kinds of waste. Even well into the 1970s, various local councils had rubbish tips on the mud flats along the edge of the river. Heavy industry also contributed its share of waste into the river from wool scouring plants in Fremantle to fertiliser and foundries sited in the Bayswater – Bassendean area.  Remedial sites works are still ongoing in these areas to remove the toxins left to leach into the river.

During the summer months there are problems with algal blooms killing fish and caused by nutrient run-off from farming activities as well as the use of fertilisers in the catchment areas. The occasional accidental spillage of sewage and chemicals has also caused sections of the river to be closed to human access.  The river has survived all this and is in relatively good condition considering on-going threats to its ecology.

In 2010 the Western Australian government imposed restrictions on phosphorus levels in fertilisers due to concerns about the health of the Swan and Canning river system.

Flood events
Data collection of flood events in the estuary has been performed since European arrival in 1829. New settlers were still arriving in steady numbers and few permanent buildings had been constructed, with most living in tents and other temporary accommodation. These included caves along the river's edge and many found their belongings washed away and livestock drowned. Other abnormal flooding events occurred in the winters of 1847 and 1860, while the most recent flooding occurred in 2017. Later events have since been assessed for probability of recurrence:

The largest recorded flood event was in July 1872 which had a calculated ARI of 100.  This approximately equates to a 100-year flood event.  At the Helena River, the 1872 flood level was  higher than the 1862 event (ARI=60).  An account in The Perth Gazette and Western Australian Journal on 26 July 1872 reported
In and about Perth, the water owing to the force of the incoming seas at the mouth of the river presented a scene of a great lake, all the jetties were submerged, the high roads to Fremantle covered, and passage traffic rendered impossible quantities of sandalwood lying along the banks of river were washed away, and the inhabitants of the suburban villas on the slopes of Mount Eliza obliged to scramble up the hill sides to get into Perth.

The flood of July 1926 (ARI=30) resulted in the washing away of the Upper Swan Bridge and a section of the Fremantle Railway Bridge. The Fremantle bridge partially collapsed on 22 July 1926, five minutes after a train containing schoolchildren had passed over. No one was injured in the collapse, however it created major disruption to commerce for several months.  Repairs were completed and the bridge reopened on 12 October 1926.

Governance
The Swan River Trust is a state government body, within the ambit of the Department of Environment and Conservation (Western Australia) – that was constituted in 1989 after legislation passed the previous year, that reports to the Minister for the Environment. It brings together eight representatives from the community, State and local government authorities with an interest in the Swan and Canning rivers to form a single body responsible for planning, protecting and managing Perth's river system.

The Trust meets twice a month to provide advice to the Minister for the Environment, the Western Australian Planning Commission and river border related local government bodies to guide development of the Swan and Canning rivers.

Human uses

Transport
In the earliest days of the Swan River Settlement, the river was used as the main transport route between Perth and Fremantle.  This continued until the establishment of the Government rail system between Fremantle and Guildford via Perth.

Bridges

There are currently 22 road and railway bridges crossing the Swan River. These are (from Fremantle, heading upstream):
 Fremantle Railway Bridge, North Fremantle to Fremantle (Fremantle railway line)
 Fremantle Traffic Bridge, North Fremantle to Fremantle
 Stirling Bridge (Stirling Highway), North Fremantle to East Fremantle
 Narrows Bridge, South Perth to Perth (Kwinana Freeway and Mandurah railway line; 2001) – northbound
 Narrows Bridge, Perth to South Perth (Mandurah railway line)
 Narrows Bridge, Perth to South Perth (Kwinana Freeway; 1959) – southbound
 The Causeway (north), Perth to Heirisson Island
 The Causeway (south), Heirisson Island to South Perth
 Matagarup Bridge, East Perth to Perth Stadium, Burswood (pedestrian bridge)
 Goongoongup Bridge, East Perth to Burswood (Armadale railway line)
 Windan Bridge, East Perth to Burswood, (Graham Farmer Freeway)
 Garratt Road Bridge, Bayswater to Ascot – northbound
 Garratt Road Bridge, Ascot to Bayswater (Garratt Road and Grandstand Road) – southbound
 Redcliffe Bridge, Bayswater to Ascot (Tonkin Highway)
 Bassendean Bridge, Bassendean to Guildford (Guildford Road and Bridge Street)
 Guildford Railway Bridge, Bassendean to Guildford (Midland railway line)
 Barkers Bridge, Guildford to Caversham (Meadow Street and West Swan Road)
 Whiteman Bridge, Caversham to Middle Swan (Reid Highway and Roe Highway)
 Maali Bridge, Henley Brook to Herne Hill (pedestrian bridge; formerly called the Barrett Street Bridge)
 Yagan Bridge, Belhus to Upper Swan (Great Northern Highway; formerly called the Upper Swan Bridge)
 Upper Swan railway bridge, Upper Swan (unnamed)
 Bells Rapids bridge, Upper Swan to Brigadoon (unnamed)

Rowing clubs
The earliest club was the West Australian Rowing Club. The Swan River Rowing Club started in 1887. The Fremantle Rowing Club had started by the 1890s.

Yacht clubs

There are currently fifteen yacht clubs along the Swan River, with most on Melville Water, Freshwater Bay and Matilda Bay. Royal Perth Yacht Club, on Pelican Point in Matilda Bay, staged the unsuccessful 1987 America's Cup defence, the first time in 132 years it had been held outside of the United States. RPYC and the Royal Freshwater Bay Yacht Club are the only two clubs to be granted a royal charter. There are also many anchorages and marinas along the lower reaches near Fremantle.

Cultural significance
The river is a significant part of Perth culture, with many water sports such as rowing, sailing, and swimming all occurring in its waters.

There have been some north of the river or south of the river distinctions in the Perth metropolitan region over time, especially in the time up to the completion of the Causeway and Narrows bridges, due to the time and distances to cross the river.

The river was the site of the City of Perth Skyworks, a fireworks show held each year on Australia Day from 1985 until 2022, with spectators crowding the foreshore, Kings Park, and on boats on the river to watch the event.

See also

 List of islands of Perth, Western Australia

Notes

References

Further reading

 Thompson, James (1911) Improvements to Swan River navigation 1830–1840 [cartographic material] Perth, W.A. : Western Australian Institution of Engineers, 1911. (Perth : Govt. Printer) Battye Library note: – Issued as Drawing no. 1 accompanying Inaugural address by Thompson 31 March 1910 as first president of the Western Australian Institution of Engineers, – Cadastral base map from Lands and Surveys Dept with additions by Thompson showing river engineering works from Burswood to Hierrison [i.e., Heirisson] islands and shorelines as they existed 1830–1840; includes Aboriginal place names along Swan River Estuary.

External links
Swan River Trust
 Bridging to South Perth by Lloyd Margetts A copy of his speech given to the South Perth Historical Society.
Historical map of the Swan River
Swan River Electronic Navigation Chart
University of Western Australia – Center for Water Research

 
Rivers of Western Australia
Swan Coastal Plain